The Montenegro Tennis Association (MTA) is the governing body of tennis in Montenegro. It is based in Podgorica and its current president is Petar Ivanović.

It also organizes the Montenegrin Davis Cup team and the Montenegrin Fed Cup team.

The association was formed on 18 November 1976/1978? in Cetinje. It became a member of the International Tennis Federation (ITF) on 24 August 2006.

External links 
 Official website
 Montenegrin Olympic Committee: Tennis Federation 

Montenegro
Tennis in Montenegro
Tennis
Tennis organizations
1970s establishments in Montenegro